Yolandi Potgieter (born 16 May 1989) is a South African cricketer who currently captains Free State. She plays as an all-rounder, batting right-handed and bowling right-arm medium. In 2013 and 2014, she appeared in 16 One Day Internationals and seven Twenty20 Internationals for South Africa. She has previously played domestic cricket for Boland, as well as appearing in a tour match for Western Province in 2009.

References

External links
 
 

1989 births
Living people
Cricketers from Bellville, South Africa
South African women cricketers
South Africa women One Day International cricketers
South Africa women Twenty20 International cricketers
Boland women cricketers
Western Province women cricketers
Free State women cricketers
West Coast women cricketers
20th-century South African women
21st-century South African women